Michael A. Brown was managing director of the Defense Department's Innovation Unit. He previously served as chief executive officer for Symantec. Brown has also served as chairman of the board for Line 6 and for EqualLogic and as CEO and chairman of the board for Quantum Corp.

In 1980, Brown received a Bachelor of Arts in economics from Harvard University. In 1984, he earned an Master of Business Administration from the Stanford University Graduate School of Business. In November 2016, Brown was named a Presidential Innovation Fellow.

On April 2, 2021, President Joe Biden nominated Brown to be the Under Secretary of Defense for Acquisition and Sustainment. On July 14, in a letter to Secretary of Defense Lloyd Austin, Brown requested that his nomination be withdrawn, citing an ongoing Department of Defense Inspector General investigation. Brown left his position as managing director on September 2, 2022, and on September 9, 2022, the DoD Inspector General found the allegations to be unsubstantiated.

References 

1950s births
Living people
Harvard College alumni
Stanford University alumni
American chief executives
United States Department of Defense officials